Air Vice Marshal Chandan Singh, MVC, AVSM, VrC  (18 August 1925 – 29 March 2020) was an Air Officer in the Indian Air Force. A highly decorated officer, Singh was awarded the Vir Chakra during the Sino-Indian War and the Maha Vir Chakra during the Indo-Pakistani War of 1971.

Early life
Singh was born in Jodhpur State in a Rathore Rajput family to Colonel Bahadur Singh, OBI, who commanded the famous Jodhpur Lancers.

Military career

Early career
Singh joined the Jodhpur Lancers in 1941, following in his father's footsteps, as a Second Lieutenant. After the Independence of India, the Jodhpur Lancers was amalgamated into the President's Bodyguard and the 61st Cavalry. Singh, then a Captain, joined the Indian Air Force.

Singh was serving in the No. 43 Squadron IAF, when in 1961, he was awarded the Ati Vishisht Seva Medal (then called Vishisht Seva Medal Class II). He was awarded the AVSM for "devising new procedures for training and selecting new safe routes."

Vir Chakra
At the outbreak of the Sino-Indian War, Singh was a pilot in the No. 44 Squadron IAF. He saw action in the Chip Chap area in Ladakh, where he was awarded the third-highest war-time gallantry award, the Vir Chakra.

The citation for the Vir Chakra reads as follows:

Maha Vir Chakra
Singh was promoted to the rank of Group Captain in late 1969 and took over command of the Jorhat Air Force Station in early 1970. He commanded the Air Force base through the Indo-Pakistani War of 1971. Singh planned and executed the Sylhet air-lift, when two companies of troops of the IV Corps were air-lifted. For this operation, Singh was awarded the Maha Vir Chakra, the second-highest war-time gallantry award.

The citation for the Maha Vir Chakra reads as follows:

Post-war career
After the war, Singh attended the Royal College of Defence Studies in the United Kingdom. Singh was promoted to Air Commodore in 1973 and to the rank of Air Vice Marshal in 1977. He then took over as the Senior Air Staff Officer (SASO) of the Central Air Command in Allahabad.

After a three-year stint as SASO, Singh retired in 1980.

Awards and decorations

References

Indian Air Force air marshals
Recipients of the Maha Vir Chakra
Recipients of the Vir Chakra
1925 births
2020 deaths
Indian Air Force officers